South Weeks, or Mount Weeks-South Peak, is a mountain located in Coos County, New Hampshire, within the western part of the city limits of Berlin. The mountain is named for US Senator John W. Weeks (1860–1926) of nearby Lancaster, New Hampshire, the sponsor of the Weeks Act of 1911, under which the White Mountain National Forest was established. South Weeks is part of the Pliny Range of the White Mountains. South Weeks is flanked to the northeast by Mount Weeks, and to the southwest by Mount Waumbek.

South Weeks stands within the watershed of the upper Connecticut River, which drains into Long Island Sound in Connecticut.
The southeast side of the mountain drains by various streams into Keenan Brook, thence into the Upper Ammonoosuc River, a tributary of the Connecticut.
The north and west sides of the mountain drain into Garland Brook, thence into Stalbird Brook and the Israel River, another tributary of the Connecticut.

See also 

 List of mountains in New Hampshire
 White Mountain National Forest
 New England Hundred Highest

External links 
 

Mountains of New Hampshire
South Weeks
New England Hundred Highest